The Shrine Consolidation Policy (Jinja seirei, also Jinja gōshi, Jinja gappei) was an effort by the Government of Meiji Japan to abolish numerous smaller Shinto shrines and consolidate their functions with larger regional shrines. In 1900, the Shrine Bureau (Jinja kyoku) was created as a branch of the Home Ministry, and it was this organ that was responsible for the implementation of the policy.

The aim of the policy was to reduce the political influence of Shinto, bringing the remaining shrines under government jurisdiction and making them easier to control. Within the first twenty years of the policy, 77,899 Shinto shrines were closed, despite considerable local opposition. The policy remained in effect until the end of World War II, although its greatest impact occurred in the first six years after its implementation in 1906; by 1912, the rate at which shrines were closed had fallen considerably.

Meiji period
Politics of the Empire of Japan
Shinto shrines

Overview
The process of Shrine Consolidation involved either enshrining the deities of multiple shrines in one shrine, or relocating them to the Setsumatsusha of one shrine and eliminating the other shrines.

The Japanese government carried out shrine merger policies between the end of the Meiji and the start of the Taisho eras, with the goal of enhancing the presence of shrines as a whole.The Shrine Bureau in the Home Ministry planned the reorganization and abolition of smaller, unviable shrines, particularly village shrines and unranked shrines.
The government's stated purpose was to organize existing shrines and limit the provision of shrine offerings to a select few.  However it was accused of corruption and attempting to seize land for financial gain  An imperial edict in 1906 entitled "With Regard to the Provision of Offerings to Shrines of Prefectural Rank and Below" was the beginning of this. The sought to financially support shrines but only those that were thriving, so the government started merging shrines so only supported shrines would be present. The surrender of land belonging to merged shrines, temples, and other sacred sites was required under the 1906 edict, without compensation. Local authorities in Wakayama and Mie prefectures in particular forced through a rigorous program of mergers, resulting in a significant reduction in the number of shrines by 1914. 

Some intellectuals and politicians resisted the merger policy, leading to its eventual eschewal by the Shrine Bureau.

Shrine merger at the end of the Meiji period

Purpose of Shrine merger 
The purpose of Shrine merger was to reduce the number of shrines and concentrate expenses on the remaining shrines so that they would be equipped with facilities and property above a certain standard, to maintain the dignity of the shrines, and to establish the continuous management of the shrines. In addition, the Meiji government's national principle that sect Shinto is recognized as a religion, but that shrines are not religions but "national religious ceremonies" (suzoku, seiji, sasai system)）The policy was also to reduce the number of shrines until it was financially feasible for local governments to provide public funds to prefectural shrines and smaller shrines in accordance with the Ministry of the Interior.

This policy was led by the Ministry of Home Affairs Shrine Bureau, but apparently the Ministry's  were also involved. The local bureaus were reluctant to allow local governments to contribute public funds to shrines below the prefectural level, which was one of the purposes of Shrine merger, because it would require local governments to bear an additional fiscal burden. It was incorporated into the policy.

The shrine-centered theory refers to the idea that local autonomy should be centered on shrines, and this led to the application of the "one town, one village, one shrine" standard to the policy of enshrinement. By aligning the shrine's Ujiko area with administrative divisions, the government sought to make the sole shrine of a town village the center of local activities.

Background of the ritual policy 
The shrine ritual policy was promoted by the edict issued by the Minister of the Interior, Takashi Hara, in the 1st Saionji Cabinet in 1906 (Meiji 39), and initially it was given a considerable range according to the actual situation of the region. there were. However, 70,000 shrines, which were about 200,000 by 1914 (Taisho 3), were demolished nationwide because Tosuke Hirata, the Minister of Interior of the Second Katsura Cabinet, ordered that the instruction be strongly promoted. rice field. In particular, Mie Prefecture had a particularly strong policy of enshrining, and about 90% of all shrines in the prefecture were abolished. Wakayama and Ehime prefectures were followed by a ritual policy. However, since it was left to the governor's discretion to proceed with this policy, the degree of implementation will vary from region to region, and in Kyoto Prefecture it is about 10%.

This shrine ritual policy based on bureaucratic rationalism was not always carried out in the will of the worshipers of the parishioners. As a matter of course, the settlements and administrative divisions do not always match, and in some areas, the Ujigami was moved to a place far from the place of residence due to the goshi, and the Ujigami could not go to worship. Some shrines refused to worship, but in some places the worship was forcibly performed.

Opposition movement 
On the part of the shrine parishioners and worshippers, they sometimes held meetings in opposition, but mainly they could not make any major movements, and could only show their dissatisfaction in the form of talking about how the deities of the shrines that had been abolished by the merged shrine had caused hauntings, etc.

That said, intellectuals such as Kumagusu Minakata, a naturalist and folklore scholar known for his research on slime molds, strongly opposed this policy . In the south, the shrine merger movement was

 weakening the godly thought, 
 hindering the harmony of the people, 
 debilitating the regions,
 depriving the people of comfort, diminishing humanity and harming customs, 
 damaging patriotism, and 
 damaging security of the land. 
 historic sites and ancient traditions would be destroyed
 natural landscapes and natural monuments would be destroyed.

These opposition movements gradually came to a halt, and through the responses of the Imperial Diet, the sudden increase in enshrinement was temporarily halted after 1910 (1910-1943). However, it was already too late, and this policy of enshrinement had left a large impact, resulting in the disappearance of many rituals and customs, and damaging religious beliefs. However, it was too late, and the scars left by this ritual policy were large, and many ritual customs disappeared, resulting in damage to religious beliefs.

Reconstruction of destroyed shrines 
After the war, the prewar shrine non-religious system was dismantled and everything became a religious corporation . Many shrines were once merged and then revived. Even after the shrine was nominally enshrined, there were some places where facilities such as the shrine were left, and it was easy to rehabilitate in those places. Overall, it was easy to rehabilitate where the pre-government reverence base was maintained, but if the community that became the worship base disappeared or changed due to the consolidation of administrative divisions or changes in circumstances.

Influence on the division of Shrine Shinto 

See also 

 Shinto
 State Shinto
 Glossary of Shinto
 Haibutsu kishaku
 Shinbutsu bunri
 Shinbutsu-shūgō

References

External links 

 南方熊楠「神社合祀に関する意見」（青空文庫）
 神社をめぐる住民感情と官僚的合理主義 森岡清美、『日本常民文化紀要』、1975年

State Shinto
Shinbutsu bunri
Meiji period
Shinto shrines
Pages with unreviewed translations